Sun-sun (kana: ジュン ジュン; romaji: junjun; 1914 - January 8, 1943), born Lâu Chheng-hiong (劉清香), was a Taiwanese popular singer.

Biography
Sun-sun was born in 1914 and joined a troupe at the age of 13.

She was active in the 1930s and early 1940s, and sang many Taiwanese or Japanese popular songs which had just been published at her time, such as the Bang Chhun Hong, The Torment of a Flower, and the Tho Hoe Khi Hiat Ki (桃花泣血記), a song used for advertising at Taiwan for a Shanghai film of same name which had an English title called "The Peach Girl".

She died at age 28 after contracting tuberculosis from her husband, a Japanese surnamed Shiraishi.

In popular culture
Her biography has been dramatized, as a main character, in the 2003 film Viva Tonal - The Dance Age (跳舞時代), and a musical named April Rain (四月望雨).

See also
Cinema of Taiwan
Taiwanese pop

References

1914 births
1943 deaths
Taiwanese people of Hoklo descent
Southern Min-language singers
20th-century Taiwanese women singers